The S6 is a regional railway service of the S-Bahn Zürich on the Zürcher Verkehrsverbund (ZVV), Zürich transportation network, and is one of the network's services connecting the cantons of Zürich and Aargau.

Route 
 

The service links Baden, in the canton of Aargau to the west of Zürich, and Uetikon, on north shore of Lake Zürich to the east of Zürich. From Baden it runs via the Furttal railway and Regensdorf-Watt to Zürich Oerlikon, and then serves Zurich Hauptbahnhof and Zürich Stadelhofen before running over the Lake Zürich right-bank railway line to its terminus. 

The following stations are served:

 Baden
 Wettingen
 Würenlos
 Otelfingen
 Otelfingen Golfpark
 Buchs-Dällikon
 Regensdorf-Watt
 Zürich Affoltern
 Zürich Seebach
 Zürich Oerlikon
 Zürich Hardbrücke
 Zürich Hauptbahnhof
 Zürich Stadelhofen
 Zürich Tiefenbrunnen
 Zollikon
 Küsnacht Goldbach
 Küsnacht ZH 
 Erlenbach ZH
 Winkel am Zürichsee
 Herrliberg-Feldmeilen
 Meilen
 Uetikon

Route

Rolling stock 
 most services are operated with RABe 514 class trains; some operate with the RABe 511 class.

Scheduling 
The normal frequency  over the length of the service is one train every 30 minutes. Between Zürich Oerlikon and Herrliberg-Feldmeilen, the S6 combines with the S16 to provide a frequency of one train every 15 minutes. The eastern end of the service is cut back to Tiefenbrunnen in the evening, whilst on weekdays four trains during the middle of the day start and terminate at Wettingen. 

A journey over the full length of the service takes 66 or 67 minutes, depending on direction.

See also 

 Rail transport in Switzerland
 Trams in Zürich

References

External links 
 
 ZVV official website: Routes & zones

Zürich S-Bahn lines
Transport in Aargau
Transport in the canton of Zürich